Big Wave Bay or Tai Long Wan is the name of several bays in Hong Kong:

Big Wave Bay, Hong Kong Island
Big Wave Bay Beach, Hong Kong
Tai Long Wan, Chi Ma Wan
Tai Long Wan (Sai Kung District)
Tai Long Wan, Shek Pik